Nikolai Arnoldovich Petrov (14 April 19433 August 2011) was a Russian pianist.

Petrov was born in Moscow, the son of the cellist Arnold Ferkelman and the grandson of the operatic bass Vasily Rodionovich Petrov, and began learning the piano at the age of three. At the Central Music School of the Moscow Conservatory his teacher was Tatyana Kestner and in 1961 Petrov entered the class of Yakov Zak at the Conservatory itself. He subsequently won second prize at the Van Cliburn International Piano Competition in Fort Worth, Texas and won second prize at the  Queen Elisabeth International Music Competition in Brussels.

Petrov gave regular performances in the Great Hall of the Moscow Conservatory as well as touring widely and appearing at major world venues such as Carnegie Hall, the Concertgebouw, the Royal Festival Hall (London) and the Teatro Colón. Petrov's large repertoire included more than fifty concertos and he worked with many prominent conductors, including Mariss Jansons, Kirill Kondrashin, Gennady Rozhdestvensky, Yevgeny Svetlanov and Yuri Temirkanov.

His awards included the Grande Médaille d'Or of the Académie Balzac, People's Artist of the USSR and the Russian State Prize. In 1998, he founded the Nikolai Petrov International Philanthropic Foundation.

He served on the jury at the 2007 International Tchaikovsky Piano Competition.

Nikolay Petrov died in August 2011, aged 68.  He was survived by his widow Larissa and daughter Evgenia.

In a telegram to his family, Russian President Dmitry Medvedev stated:

Honours and awards
 Order of Merit for the Fatherland, 3rd class and 4th class
 Order of Honour (2008)
 Honored Artist of the RSFSR (1975)
 People's Artist of RSFSR (1986)
 People's Artist of the USSR (1991)
 State Prize of the Russian Federation (1993)

References 

1943 births
2011 deaths
Russian classical pianists
Male classical pianists
People's Artists of the USSR
Recipients of the Order "For Merit to the Fatherland", 3rd class
Recipients of the Order of Honour (Russia)
Honored Artists of the RSFSR
People's Artists of Russia
State Prize of the Russian Federation laureates
Prize-winners of the Queen Elisabeth Competition
Prize-winners of the Van Cliburn International Piano Competition
Musicians from Moscow
20th-century classical pianists
Burials in Troyekurovskoye Cemetery
20th-century Russian male musicians